Equity Bank is a community bank. It is headquartered in Wichita, Kansas with locations in Arkansas, Kansas, Missouri, and Oklahoma.  Equity Bank's parent company, Equity Bancshares, Inc., is based in Wichita. It trades on the Nasdaq Global Select Market under the ticker symbol ‘EQBK'. Equity Bank has grown primarily through acquisitions: of First Community Bank, Prairie State Bancshares Inc., Adams Dairy Bank, First National Bank of Liberal, City Bank & Trust, and MidFirst Bank. 

As of July 2019, Equity Bank was a $4 billion community bank with 52 bank locations. It offers commercial loans, consumer banking, mortgage loans and treasury management services.

History 
Equity Bank was founded in Andover, Kansas in 2003. Equity Bank completed an initial public offering in November 2015, offering more than 2.2 million shares. Its common stock found an opening price of $22.50 per share on the NASDAQ exchange.

In November 2016, Equity Bank acquired Community First Bank of Harrison, Arkansas. In March 2017, Equity Bancshares Inc. completed its merger with Prairie State Bancshares Inc. This acquisition expanded Equity branch locations throughout Kansas to Hoxie, Grinnell, and Quinter. In March 2018, Equity Bank gained regulatory approval to acquire Adams Dairy Bank in Blue Springs, Missouri and First National Bank of Liberal in Liberal, Kansas. In August 2018, Equity Bank completed the acquisition of City Bank & Trust of Guymon, Oklahoma. In October 2018, Equity Bank completed the acquisition of Midfirst Bank in Guymon and New Cordell, Oklahoma. 

In February 2019, Equity Bank in Kansas City was robbed.

References 

Banks based in Kansas
Wichita, Kansas